Thimmasandra Madiah Gowda (17 March 1896 – 24 May 1971) was an Indian politician. He was elected to the Lok Sabha, the Lower House of the Parliament, from Bangalore south constituency in 1952 as a member of parliament from Indian National Congress. He was also  Member of the Legislative Assembly (MLA) from Ramanagara between 1962 and 1967.

Early life 
Madiah Gowda pursued his earlier education in the Government School at Channapatna and later graduated in arts from the Central College, Bengaluru. He was then awarded LLB from ILS Law College, Pune, where a later chief minister of Karnataka, S Nijalingapa, was a contemporary.

Political career 
Madiah Gowda was involved in political activities with the Indian National Congress in Ramanagara earlier known as Closepet prior to independence of India. After independence, he was elected as a member of the First Lok Sabha from the Bangalore South constituency in 1952. He was elected to the Legislative Assembly of Karnataka from the Ramanagara constituency in 1962.

Madiah Gowda also served in Mysore Representative Assembly, Mysore Legislative Council, Mysore Constituent Assembly and Mysore Legislative Assembly. He enabled the building of many schools, colleges and hospitals across his constituency and also took part in the development of various agricultural, irrigation and industrial projects.

Posts held 

Mr Gowda became an advocate after completing his law degree. during his career period he worked as advocate for Mysore University Council, University senate, Secondary education board, School board of adult education council, Rural development committees, and Co-operative societies and participated in many seminars on the agricultural and experimental union, Sir M Visvesvaraya Rural Industrialising Scheme activities and cottage industries programs. He was a member of the Ramanagara Municipal Council, Bangalore District Board and Bangalore Local Education Board.

He was the president of Mysore State Adult Education Council from 1947 and later he became vice-president of the Indian Adult Education Association. He was a District Scouts commissioner and later became chairman of Bangalore Rural district. He was also a member of Bangalore district rural development committee.

References 

1896 births
1971 deaths
India MPs 1952–1957
Indian National Congress (Organisation) politicians
Indian National Congress politicians from Karnataka
Kannada people
Lok Sabha members from Karnataka
Members of the Constituent Assembly of India
Mysore State
People from Ramanagara district
Ramanagara district